Letting Go (1962) is the first full-length novel written by Philip Roth and is set in the 1950s.

Plot summary

Gabe Wallach is a graduate student in literature at the University of Iowa and an ardent admirer of Henry James. Fearing that the intellectual demands of a life in literature might leave him cloistered, Gabe seeks solace in what he thinks of as "the world of feeling". Following the death of his mother at the opening of the novel, Gabe befriends his fellow graduate student Paul Herz.

The novel Letting Go is divided into seven (7) sections:

1. "Debts and Sorrows"

Having served in the Korean War after college, Gabe Wallach is finishing his military service in Oklahoma when he receives a letter his mother wrote to him from her death bed. After reading the letter Wallach places it in The Portrait of a Lady by Henry James. The narrative then skips forward to a year later when Wallach is working on a graduate degree in literature at the University of Iowa. Wallach lends his copy of The Portrait of a Lady to a fellow graduate student, Paul Herz.  Later Wallach realizes that he left the letter from his mother in the pages of the book and in his attempt to retrieve the book he meets Paul's wife, Libby.  Gabe learns from Libby that Paul is teaching classes at another school and realizes how poor the Herzs are. He drives Libby to where Paul's car has broken down on a trip from this second school and witnesses the first of many arguments between Paul and Libby. Libby also reveals to Gabe that she read the letter from his now-deceased mother.  This is the beginning of the several instances where the characters begin to imagine the life of the other and believe that they understand it completely based on very little actual evidence.

During this opening section, Gabe also communicates with his father. Gabe, as narrator, paints his father as a weak and needy man although he is a successful dentist in New York. During phone conversations Gabe's father nearly begs him to return home and questions his son about why he would go so far from New York to graduate school.

Alone with a very sick Libby, Gabe kisses her once. Gabe also has a relationship with Marge Howells, an undergraduate from a well-to-do WASP family who is openly rebelling from her parents.  While Gabe is in New York visiting his father, he breaks up with Marge over the telephone.  He asks Paul to help move Marge out of his apartment.

Gabe gets a job as an English teacher at the University of Chicago. At a party, he meets Martha Reganhart, a waitress and a divorced mother of two children. When the university has a vacancy, Gabe recommends Paul Herz, who takes the job.

2. "Paul Loves Libby"

In section two, Roth tells the story of Paul and Libby's courtship and the early years of their marriage.  They meet while both of them are students at Cornell University.  Paul is the only child of Jewish parents in Brooklyn, NY. Paul's father has failed at a number of businesses but Paul is recognized as a smart and gifted child.  Libby is the child of Catholic parents. Neither Paul nor Libby is very serious about their religious backgrounds and have no problem courting each other because of it; however, both sets of parents are upset by this. Over Christmas break Paul tells his parents about the engagement.  They react poorly and end up convincing Paul to speak with his two uncles. One of them, his Uncle Asher is a lifelong bachelor whom most of the family pities because they don't think he can find someone to marry. Paul, however, learns that Asher just does not want to be married.  Asher has had a long series of sexual encounters while single and has no desire to be married. The blunt language of Asher is the first, and perhaps the most dominant, example in this novel of the frank sexual dialogue and discussion that Roth would later become renowned and notorious for.

Faced with many conflicting opinions, none of which he really wants to listen to, Paul decides to go ahead and elope with Libby on Christmas Eve.  Soon after their marriage, the couple learns that Libby's father will no longer support her. Eventually they end up in Michigan, both taking a break from school while they work to save up money.  They live in a small room in a boarding house mostly occupied by seniors. Libby becomes pregnant and at work one day, Paul hurts himself in the factory.  He tells the factory doctor that his mind was distracted by his pregnant wife. The doctor responds by giving him the name and number of a doctor who will perform abortions. After much discussion and a few arguments, Libby gets an abortion.

3.  "The Power of Thanksgiving"

4.  "Three Women"

5.  "Children and Men"

6.  "The Mad Crusader"

7.  "Letting Go."

Themes

Much of the tension in the novel comes from the conflict between the characters and the social constraints of the 1950s.  Romantic relationships are most heavily scrutinized.  Paul Herz and his wife Libby become estranged from their families because one is Jewish and the other is Christian (religion reemerges as an issue towards the end of the novel).

Social class also plays a role, especially between Gabe and his girlfriend for much of the novel, Martha, who is a divorced mother of two struggling to make ends meet.  Martha repeatedly fears that Gabe will leave her.  Gabe, at one point, tells a fellow University of Chicago faculty member that he should marry her, but he ultimately flees back to Martha.

Throughout the novel, the characters are confronted with the sometimes-thin line separating sexual promiscuity from sanctity in the eyes of the predominant culture.  Abortion, divorce, remarriage and adoption affect the lives and psyches of Roth's subjects as the plot unfolds.

One remarkable stylistic trait of the novel is the use of two narrative modes.  Parts of the story are narrated by Gabe Wallach, in the first person.  Other parts of the story are narrated using an omniscient narrator.  The contrast between what Gabe understands about the events in the story and the other characters' viewpoints on different events creates deeper interest in their misunderstandings, conflicts, and goals.  It also draws the reader to speculate upon his own understanding of the characters' actions and motives.

References

1962 American novels
Novels by Philip Roth
Fiction set in the 1950s
Random House books
Novels republished in the Library of America
Christian and Jewish interfaith dialogue
1962 debut novels